Jorge Bátiz (born 2 December 1933) is an Argentinian former cyclist, who competed primarily in track cycling but also occassinally on the road. Professional from 1958 to 1965, he won the Six Days of Buenos Aires five times.

Major results
1955
 1st  Sprint, Pan American Games
 2nd  Sprint, UCI Amateur Track World Championships
1956
 2nd  Sprint, UCI Amateur Track World Championships
1958
 1st Six Days of Buenos Aires (with Fausto Coppi)
1959
 1st Six Days of Buenos Aires (with Mino De Rossi)
1960
 2nd Six Days of Buenos Aires
1961
 1st Six Days of Buenos Aires (with Miguel Poblet)
 2nd Six Days of Madrid
1963
 1st Six Days of Buenos Aires (with Ricardo Senn)
 2nd Six Days of Madrid
1964
 1st Six Days of Buenos Aires (with Ricardo Senn)

References

1933 births
Living people
Argentine male cyclists
Argentine track cyclists
People from Tandil
Pan American Games medalists in cycling
Pan American Games gold medalists for Argentina
Cyclists at the 1955 Pan American Games
Medalists at the 1955 Pan American Games
Sportspeople from Buenos Aires Province